"Big in Vegas" is a single by American country music artist Buck Owens. Released in October 1969, it was the first single from his album Big in Vegas. The song peaked at number 5 on the Billboard Hot Country Singles chart. It also reached number 1 on the RPM Country Tracks chart in Canada.

Content
The song is about a young singer hoping to realizing his dream to perform in a large venue in Las Vegas, Nevada, despite his mother's pleas not to go. Despite the struggles of playing smaller arenas, honky tonks and so forth, he continues to be driven by his dream of one day having his name in lights and performing before a large crowd.

Music video
A music video of the song – compiled of Owens singing, over superimposed footage of an Owens' concert and nighttime shots of the Las Vegas Strip – was originally aired on the TV series Hee Haw, on which Owens was a co-host. The video has since aired on Great American Country.

Chart performance

References

1969 singles
Buck Owens songs
Songs written by Buck Owens
Songs written by Terry Stafford
Capitol Records singles
1969 songs